The 16th César Awards ceremony, presented by the Académie des Arts et Techniques du Cinéma, honoured the best French films of 1990 and took place on 9 March 1991 at the Théâtre des Champs-Élysées in Paris. The ceremony was chaired by Sophia Loren and hosted by Richard Bohringer. Cyrano de Bergerac won the award for Best Film.

Winners and nominees
The winners are highlighted in bold:

Best Film:Cyrano de Bergerac, directed by Jean-Paul RappeneauLe Mari de la coiffeuse, directed by Patrice LeconteNikita, directed by Luc BessonLe Petit criminel, directed by Jacques DoillonUranus, directed by Claude Berri
Best Foreign Film:Dead Poets Society, directed by Peter WeirGoodfellas, directed by Martin ScorsesePretty Woman, directed by Garry MarshallTaksi-Blyuz, directed by Pavel Lungin¡Átame!, directed by Pedro Almodóvar
Best First Work:La Discrète, directed by Christian VincentAsfour Stah, directed by Férid BoughedirL'Autre, directed by Bernard GiraudeauMado, poste restante, directed by Aleksandr AdabashyanOutremer, directed by Brigitte RoüanUn week-end sur deux, directed by Nicole Garcia
Best Actor:Gérard Depardieu, for Cyrano de BergeracFabrice Luchini, for La DiscrèteMichel Serrault, for Docteur PetiotDaniel Auteuil, for LacenaireJean Rochefort, for Le Mari de la coiffeuseMichel Piccoli, for Milou en Mai
Best Actress:Anne Parillaud, for NikitaAnne Brochet, for Cyrano de BergeracMiou-Miou, for Milou en maiTsilla Chelton, for Tatie DanielleNathalie Baye, for Un week-end sur deux
Best Supporting Actor:Jacques Weber, for Cyrano de BergeracMaurice Garrel, for La DiscrèteMichel Duchaussoy, for Milou en maiMichel Galabru, for Uranus Daniel Prévost, for Uranus
Best Supporting Actress:Dominique Blanc, for Milou en maiThérèse Liotard, for La Gloire de mon père and Le Château de ma mèreOdette Laure, for Daddy NostalgieCatherine Jacob, for Tatie DanielleDanièle Lebrun, for Uranus
Best Newcomer (Male)Gérald Thomassin –  (Le Petit criminel)Alex Descas –  (S'en fout la mort)Marc Duret – NikitaVincent Pérez –  (Cyrano de Bergerac)Philippe Uchan –  (Le Château de ma mère)
Best Newcomer (Female)Judith Henry – (La Discrète)Clotilde Courau – (Le Petit criminel) lorence Darel – UranusJudith Godrèche –  (La Désenchantée)Isabelle Nanty –(Tatie Danielle) 
Best Director:Jean-Paul Rappeneau, for Cyrano de BergeracPatrice Leconte, for Le Mari de la coiffeuseLuc Besson, for NikitaJacques Doillon, for Le Petit criminelClaude Berri, for Uranus
Best Writing:Christian Vincent, Jean-Pierre Ronssin, for La DiscrèteJean-Claude Carrière, Jean-Paul Rappeneau, for Cyrano de BergeracClaude Klotz, Patrice Leconte, for Le Mari de la coiffeuseJacques Doillon, for Le Petit criminel
Best Cinematography:Pierre Lhomme, for Cyrano de BergeracEduardo Serra, for Le Mari de la coiffeuseThierry Arbogast, for Nikita
Best Costume Design:Franca Squarciapino, for Cyrano de BergeracAgnès Nègre, for La Gloire de mon père and Le Château de ma mèreYvonne Sassinot de Nesle, for Lacenaire
Best Sound:Pierre Gamet, Dominique Hennequin, for Cyrano de BergeracMichel Barlier, Pierre Befve, Gérard Lamps, for NikitaHenri Morelle, Pierre-Alain Besse, François Musy, for Nouvelle vague
Best Editing:Noëlle Boisson, for Cyrano de BergeracJoëlle Hache, for Le Mari de la coiffeuseOlivier Mauffroy, for Nikita
Best Music:Jean-Claude Petit, for Cyrano de BergeracVladimir Cosma, for La Gloire de mon père and Le Château de ma mèreÉric Serra, for Nikita
Best Production Design:Ezio Frigerio, for Cyrano de BergeracIvan Maussion, for Le Mari de la coiffeuseDan Weil, for Nikita
Best Fiction Short:Foutaises, directed by Jean-Pierre JeunetDeux pièces/cuisine, directed by Philippe HarelFinal, directed by Irène JouannetUhloz, directed by Guy Jacques
Best Documentary Short:La Valise, directed by François AmadoTai ti chan, directed by Chi Yan Wong
Honorary César:Jean-Pierre AumontSophia Loren

See also
 63rd Academy Awards
 44th British Academy Film Awards

External links
 Official website
 
 16th César Awards at AlloCiné

1991
1991 film awards
Cesar